Events from the year 1849 in China.

Incumbents 
 Daoguang Emperor (29th year)

Viceroys
 Viceroy of Zhili — Nergingge
 Viceroy of Min-Zhe — Liu Yunke
 Viceroy of Huguang — Yutai
 Viceroy of Shaan-Gan — Qishan (Acting Viceroy)
 Viceroy of Liangguang — Xu Guangjin
 Viceroy of Yun-Gui — Cheng Yucai
 Viceroy of Sichuan:
 Qishan
  Xu Zechun
 Viceroy of Liangjiang — Li Xingyuan

Events 
 6 April — Shanghai French Concession created 
 Jianmoda Monastery built in modern Qinghai
 August — The Passaleão incident,  a conflict between Portugal and China over Macau in August 1849
 28–29 September — Battle of Tysami, a military engagement involving a warship from the British China Squadron and the Chinese pirates of Chui A-poo

Births 
 Lu Zhongyi (Chinese: 路中一; 18 May 1849 – 26 February 1925) was the seventeenth patriarch of Yiguan Dao
 Hong Tianguifu (23 November 1849 – 18 November 1864), son of Hong Xiuquan, the second and last king of the Heavenly Kingdom of Taiping
 Sir Boshan Wei Yuk, CMG JP (1849 – 16 December 1921) a prominent Hong Kong businessman and member of the Legislative Council of Hong Kong.
 Wong Nai Siong (Chinese: 黄乃裳) (1849—1924) as a Chinese revolutionary leader and educator from Minqing county in Fuzhou, Fujian province, China.

Deaths

References